Anne Ryan (born 1969), also known as Annie Ryan, is an American film, television and theatre actress.

Ryan is known for such films and television series as Three O'Clock High, Ferris Bueller's Day Off, Lucas, Bachelors Walk and Laws of Attraction.

Filmography
Lucas (as Angie, credited as Anne Ryan)
Ferris Bueller's Day Off (as Shermerite, credited as Anne Ryan) 
Three O'Clock High (as Franny Perrins, credited as Anne Ryan)
The Last Bus Home (as Reena)
Bachelors Walk (as Kate, 3 episodes)
The Actors (as Actor in Richard III)
Laws of Attraction (as TV Host)

References

External links

1969 births
Living people
American film actresses
American television actresses
American stage actresses
21st-century American actresses
American expatriates in Ireland